Tage Aurell (1895–1976) was a Swedish journalist, novelist and translator. He was born in Oslo, Norway. He made his literary debut in 1932 with the novel Tybergs gård, while his literary breakthrough was Skillingtryck from 1943. He was awarded the Dobloug Prize in 1966.

References

1895 births
1976 deaths
Writers from Oslo
Swedish expatriates in Norway
Swedish expatriates in Germany
Swedish expatriates in France
Swedish male novelists
20th-century Swedish novelists
20th-century Swedish male writers
20th-century Swedish journalists